Minkoff is a surname. Notable people with the surname include:

Fran Minkoff (1915–2002), American songwriter
Nathaniel M. Minkoff (1893–1984), New York labor leader and assemblyman
Randy Minkoff, American writer and journalist
Rebecca Minkoff, American handbag, accessory and clothes designer
Rob Minkoff (born 1962), American animator and film director